Osama Krayem (born 16 August 1992), also known as Naïm or Naim al Hamed, is a Swedish national of Syrian origin and a suspected terrorist involved in the 2016 Brussels bombings.<ref name=pm>[http://www.parismatch.com/Actu/International/Qui-est-Osama-Krayem-complice-presume-des-kamikazes-942455 Paris Match': Qui est Osama Krayem, complice présumé des kamikazes de Bruxelles?] </ref> He was one of five men arrested on 8 April 2016 by the Belgian police.Aftonbladet: Uppgifter: Osama, 23, från Malmö gripen för Brysseldådet 

He was present at the burning alive of the Jordanian pilot Muath al-Kasasbeh of which Barack Obama described as "vicious".

Personal background
Krayem was born in 1992 in Malmö, Sweden to Palestinian immigrants from Syria and grew up in Rosengård, Malmö Municipality. At eleven years old, he participated in the 2005 documentary "Utan gränser – en film om idrott och integration" (Without Borders - A Film About Sports and Integration), a film described by Swedish newspaper Aftonbladet as "a documentary on how to succeed with integration" of migrants into Swedish society.

Krayem is thought to have radicalized in his early twenties, frequently watching videos by Anwar al-Awlaki, an American and Yemeni imam and Islamic lecturer and alleged senior recruiter and motivator involved in planning terrorist operations for the Islamist militant group Al-Qaeda. Krayem also reportedly tried to recruit other Arab Swedish youth to join the fight in Syria.RTBF: Qui est Osama Krayem, l'accompagnateur du kamikaze du metro Maelbeek, interpellé à Laeken? 

Until he was arrested in Brussels on 8 April 2016, he was one of Europe's most wanted fugitives, considered to be a hardened operative of ISIS.

The Wall Street Journal'' reported that on 20 April 2016 that Belgian authorities spelled the subject's first name as "Ossama," where previously it had been publicised as "Osama."  His detention was extended by one month on the same day.

Terrorist activities
Krayem left Sweden sometime in 2014 to join the Islamic State of Iraq and the Levant (ISIS) in Syria to fight alongside the anti-Assad Islamic militant group. He was said to be one of the first Muslim Swedes to have left the country to join ISIS. In January 2015, he was identified by the Swedish press yet again in a Facebook post sent to his brother in Sweden showing him reportedly in Deir ez-Zor, Syria dressed in military fatigues, standing in front of an ISIS flag and holding an AK-47. On 14 March 2015, he uploaded a film clip to his Facebook page showing an execution of a 19 year old Palestinian from Jerusalem. Several people from Malmö, among them Krayem's brother and friends, liked the clip along with individuals in Syria. In 2018, Belgian investigators found that Krayem was at the scene where 26-year-old Jordanian air force pilot Moaz al Kasasbeh was burned to death by ISIL in January 2015.

He later returned to Europe using a false passport travelling the migrant route from Syria to Turkey to Leros, Greece where he presented himself on 20 September 2015 as Naïm Al Hamed (identified as a Syrian national born on 1 January 1988 and originating from Hama, Syria according to the falsified papers). Under this guise as Naïm Al Hamed, he continued to Europe residing in Belgium. The beginning of October 2015, Krayem allegedly met Salah Abdeslam in Ulm, Germany to discuss possible cooperation in terrorist attacks. Abdeslam was one of the Belgian suspected terrorists involved in the 13 November 2015 Paris attacks. Fleeing the scene, Abdeslam later went into hiding in Molenbeek, Belgium where he was eventually arrested on 18 March 2016.

Krayem is believed to be the man seen on CCTV at the Brussels City 2 shopping centre, where he bought the rucksacks used later for the 22 March 2016 terror attack in Brussels Airport in Zaventem. His DNA was found in the Schaerbeek (Brussels) apartment used by the Zaventem airport bombers. He was thought to have been the second man alongside bomber Khalid El Bakraoui at the Pétillon metro station. El Bakraoui is thought to have carried out the bombing of Maelbeek metro station minutes later on the morning of 22 March 2016. During interrogation, Krayem confessed that he was the second metro bomber and explained that he felt regret at the last moment and therefore never tried to detonate his suicide bomb.

On 19 April 2016, Krayem was linked to the November 2015 Paris attacks, as it was determined that his DNA was present in the apartments used by the assailants. In June 2018 he was extradited to France into custody of the National Gendarmerie to be interrogated on his role in the November 13 Paris attack, where 130 were killed. In June 2022 he was sentenced to 30 years in prison for having assisted planning of the Paris attacks including obtained weapons.

See also 
 Brussels ISIL terror cell

References

1992 births
Swedish people of Palestinian descent
Living people
Islamic State of Iraq and the Levant members
Perpetrators of the 2016 Brussels bombings
People from Malmö
Swedish people of Syrian descent
Swedish Islamists
Islamic terrorism in Sweden
Swedish mass murderers